Ingatorp is a locality situated in Eksjö Municipality, Jönköping County, Sweden with 453 inhabitants in 2010.

References

External links 

Populated places in Jönköping County
Populated places in Eksjö Municipality